Christian Marty (16 December 1946 – 25 July 2000) was a French pilot who served as the captain of Air France Flight 4590. Prior to the crash, Marty was an athlete in extreme sports.

Athletic career 
Marty specialized in long-distance windsurfing, as well as rally driving, cycling, skiing, and hang-gliding. In 1980, Marty windsurfed from Nice, France, to Calvi, Corsica, windsurfing . In 1981 Marty became the first person to windsurf across the Atlantic Ocean, using a specially equipped sailboard and accompanied by a supply boat. His first attempt was on 28 November 1981. He left Dakar, Senegal, but was unsuccessful. His second attempt was on 12 December 1981 during which an incident occurred when Marty fell off his sailboard at nighttime. However, his flashlight on his sailboard was on, and Marty was able to swim back and climb back onto his board safely, and continued the trip without any other incident. The second attempt was a success, with Marty arriving in Kourou, French Guiana, on 18 January 1982. Marty had traveled a total , in 37 days, 16 hours and four minutes. Marty had previously lived in Guadeloupe for two years, and had previously windsurfed  from Guadeloupe to Martinique in the Caribbean.

Aviation career 
Marty had been a pilot since 12 July 1967. In 1969, he got his commercial pilot's license and started working for Air France. Marty served as a pilot and flight instructor on various aircraft, including the Boeing 727 and 737, as well as the Airbus A300, A320, and A340. He became a Concorde captain on 16 August 1999.

Death 
On 25 July 2000, Marty served as captain of Air France Flight 4590 from Paris to New York City, accompanied by first officer Jean Marcot and flight engineer Gilles Jardinaud. However, during the take-off roll, the aircraft's landing gear ran over a metal strip on the runway dropped by another aircraft, which punctured the tire and ruptured the fuel tank, causing an in-flight fire. The aircraft subsequently lost control and crashed into a hotel in Gonesse, near Charles de Gaulle Airport, killing all 109 people on board and four more people on the ground.

Bibliography

References

External links 

 Christian Marty at Find a Grave
 Pilot had surfed to fame – The Daily Telegraph
 A Man at Home with Danger – Time
 La tragédie du vol AF 4590. [The tragedy of flight AF 4590] (in French) – Libération
 Il pilota del Concorde: «Non riesco più a fermarlo» [The Concorde pilot: "I can't stop him anymore"] (in Italian) – Corriere della Sera

1946 births
2000 deaths
Sportspeople from Paris
Aviators from Paris
Concorde pilots
Aviators killed in aviation accidents or incidents in France
Pages with unreviewed translations
Victims of aviation accidents or incidents in 2000
French windsurfers